James E. Lytle Jr. (February 22, 1901 – July 17, 1987) was an American football, basketball, baseball, and golf coach and college athletics administrator. He served as the head football coach at Morris Brown College in Atlanta in 1927, Shaw University from 1928 to 1929 and again from 1934 to 1954, and Arkansas Agricultural, Mechanical & Normal College (Arkansas AM&N)—now known as University of Arkansas at Pine Bluff—from 1930 to 1931. Lytle was also the athletic director at Shaw from 1957 to 1978.

Lytle graduated from Shaw in 1921 and later earned a Master of Arts degree in physical education from Columbia University.

In 1975, Lytle was the first person inducted into the Shaw University Athletic Hall of Fame. In 1993, he was inducted into the North Carolina Sports Hall of Fame. Lytle died on July 17, 1987, following an illness.

Head coaching record

Football

References

External links
 

1901 births
1987 deaths
American football ends
Arkansas–Pine Bluff Golden Lions football coaches
Morris Brown Wolverines football coaches
Shaw Bears athletic directors
Shaw Bears baseball coaches
Shaw Bears baseball players
Shaw Bears football coaches
Shaw Bears football players
Shaw Bears men's basketball coaches
Shaw Bears men's basketball players
College golf coaches in the United States
Columbia University alumni
People from Marshville, North Carolina
Coaches of American football from North Carolina
Players of American football from North Carolina
Baseball coaches from North Carolina
Baseball players from North Carolina
Basketball coaches from North Carolina
Basketball players from North Carolina
African-American coaches of American football
African-American players of American football
African-American baseball coaches
African-American baseball players
African-American basketball coaches
African-American basketball players
African-American college athletic directors in the United States
20th-century African-American sportspeople